Dihexa (developmental code name PNB-0408), also known as N-hexanoic-Tyr-Ile-(6) aminohexanoic amide, is an oligopeptide drug derived from angiotensin IV that binds with high affinity to hepatocyte growth factor (HGF) and potentiates its activity at its receptor, c-Met. The compound has been found to potently improve cognitive function in animal models of Alzheimer's disease-like mental impairment. In an assay of neurotrophic activity, Dihexa was found to be seven orders of magnitude more potent than brain-derived neurotrophic factor.

According to a patent, "Short duration safety studies with Dihexa have uncovered no apparent toxicity. Of particular note is a lack of neoplastic induction, since c-Met is recognized as an oncogene. This is unsurprising since oncogenesis requires multiple mutations including both oncogene induction and tumor suppressor attenuation."

References

Antidementia agents
Designer drugs
Nootropics
Peptides